William Mackie FRSE DPH LLD  (1856-1932) was a Scottish physician and public health specialist, remembered for his contributions to geology.

Geology

1904 Dr Mackie proposed a basic theory for plate tectonics in a lecture to the Elgin Institute [1].

Life
He was born in Durno in rural Aberdeenshire on 28 April 1856. He was educated at the parish school in Garioch then Old Aberdeen Grammar School.

He studied Medicine at Aberdeen University graduating MB ChB in 1888. He spent most of his life in the Elgin area, first as a GP and then as Medical Officer of Health.

From 1910 to 1913 he did extensive studies of the Rhynie area in Aberdeenshire and was the first person to discover plant-bearing cherts.

In 1918 he was elected a Fellow of the Royal Society of Edinburgh. His proposers were John Horne, Ben Peach, Sir John Smith Flett and Robert Kidston.  Aberdeen University awarded him an honorary doctorate (LLD) for his contributions to Geology in 1923. He was President of the Edinburgh Geological Society from 1925 to 1927. He resigned from the Royal Society of Edinburgh in 1932.

He died in Glasgow on 15 July 1932.

References

[1] The origin of oceans and continents : lecture

1856 births
1932 deaths
People from Aberdeenshire
Scottish geologists
19th-century Scottish medical doctors
20th-century Scottish medical doctors
Alumni of the University of Aberdeen
Fellows of the Royal Society of Edinburgh